Courtland Township may refer to the following places in the United States:

 Courtland Township, Republic County, Kansas
 Courtland Township, Michigan
 Courtland Township, Nicollet County, Minnesota

Township name disambiguation pages